Darian Males (born 3 May 2001) is a Swiss professional footballer who plays as a forward for Swiss Super League club Basel, on loan from Inter Milan.

Career
On 13 June 2019, Males signed his first professional contract with his childhood club FC Luzern. He made his professional debut for Luzern in a 1–0 Swiss Super League win over Neuchâtel Xamax on 26 September 2019.

On 16 September 2020, Males signed five-year contract with the Italian team Inter Milan. Nine days later, he joined Genoa on a six month loan contract. He made one appearance for Genoa in Coppa Italia.

On 15 February 2021, Males moved on a six month loan to Swiss Super League side FC Basel. He joined Basel's first team during the winter break of their 2020–21 season under head coach Ciriaco Sforza. Males played his domestic league debut for the club in the home game in the St. Jakob-Park five days later, on 20 February, as Basel played a goalless draw with Lausanne-Sport. He scored his first goal for the club on 3 March in the home game as Basel played a 1–1 draw with the Young Boys. At the end of the season the loan came to an end and Males then returned to Inter Milan.

However, on 9 July 2021, Males returned to Basel for their 2021–22 season under their new head coach Patrick Rahmen for a further two-year loan, with an option for the club of a definitive purchase.

Career statistics

Personal life
Born in Switzerland, Males is of Bosnian Serb descent.

On 2 October 2020, he tested positive for COVID-19.

References

External links
 
 Profile
 Swiss U16 Profile
 Swiss U17 Profile
 Swiss U18 Profile
 Swiss U19 Profile

2001 births
Living people
Sportspeople from Lucerne
Association football forwards
Swiss men's footballers
Switzerland youth international footballers
Swiss people of Serbian descent
FC Luzern players
Inter Milan players
Genoa C.F.C. players
FC Basel players
Swiss Super League players
Swiss expatriate footballers
Expatriate footballers in Italy